The Victoria's Secret Fashion Show is an annual fashion show sponsored by Victoria's Secret, an American premium brand of lingerie and sleepwear. Victoria's Secret uses the show to promote and market its goods in high-profile settings. The show features some of the world's leading fashion models, such as current Victoria's Secret Angels Adriana Lima, Alessandra Ambrosio, Miranda Kerr, Doutzen Kroes, Behati Prinsloo, Candice Swanepoel, Erin Heatherton, Lily Aldridge, and Lindsay Ellingson.

The show featured performances by Rihanna, Bruno Mars, and Justin Bieber.

Fashion show segments

Segment 1: Circus (Choreographed by Christopher Harrison)

Segment 2: Dangerous Liaisons

Segment 3: Calendar Girls

Special Performance

Segment 4: PINK Ball

Segment 5: Silver Screen Angels

Segment 6: Angels In Bloom

Finale 

 Adriana Lima and  Candice Swanepoel led the finale.

Index

Victoria's Secret
2012 in fashion